Atul Sobti was the chairman and managing director from January 2016 to June 2019 of Bharat Heavy Electricals Limited (BHEL), India's largest Maharatna public sector engineering and manufacturing enterprise. Prior to his taking over the helms at BHEL in January 2016, Sobti was director on the board of BHEL, heading two portfolios of power and finance. Earlier, he also held additional charge of director (engineering, R&D). Sobti was also part-time chairman on the board of Raichur Power Corporation Limited, a joint venture company of BHEL and Karnataka Power Corporation Ltd.

Sobti is a graduate in mechanical engineering and a post graduate in international management. He also has a diploma in project management. 

As director (power), Sobti was responsible for the power sector business of BHEL.  Prior to joining the board of BHEL in 2013, Sobti worked in various capacities in segments of BHEL, including that of international operations; a major manufacturing plant of BHEL at Hyderabad; corporate planning and development; new capital projects; and project engineering and systems integration divisions at BHEL Hyderabad, and Bangalore.

Sobti is the chairman of the CII Council on Public Sector Enterprises. He is also the chair of CII's National Committee of Capital Goods and Engineering.

References

1. https://web.archive.org/web/20160509133317/https://academics.mnnit.ac.in/convocation/data/Atul%20Sobti.pdf

Businesspeople from Maharashtra
Year of birth missing (living people)
Place of birth missing (living people)
Living people
Asian Institute of Management alumni